Birthe Johanne Sparrevohn Rønn Hornbech (born 18 October 1943 in Copenhagen) is a Danish politician, member of the Folketing (the national parliament of Denmark) for Venstre, the liberal party, elected in the constituency of Køge, and former Minister for Refugees, Immigrants and Integration and for Ecclesiastical Affairs.

Hornbech graduated as cand.jur. (Master of Laws) from the University of Copenhagen in 1971. After that, she worked as a clerk at the Police and in 1981 she was promoted to deputy police commissioner. She was first elected to the Folketing in 1984.

Hornbech is known for her pronounced views and has on numerous occasions disagreed with the leadership of her own party; for instance, she voted against an increase of public surveillance.

Following the 2007 election, she became minister, although having previously denied offers of such appointment on more than one occasion.

In 2010, Hornbech  came under public scrutiny as the Minister of Integration, when it was discovered that young stateless Palestinians living in Denmark were being illegally denied Danish citizenship, with her knowledge. On 8 March 2011, she was fired from her ministries because of this.

Bibliography
Hornbech has expressed her views and her experiences in a number of books:
 Og så gik, 1990
 Udlændinge i Danmark, 1993
 Så gik der politik i det, Gyldendal, 1997
 En lige venstre, Gyldendal, 2001
 Ret og rimeligt, Gyldendal, 2004,  (Hornbech deals out clips on the ears of politicians, voters and non-voters)
 Kirsten Jacobsen: På livet løs - En samtale mellem Lise Nørgaard og Birthe Rønn Hornbech, Gyldendal, 2004 (a conversation with Lise Nørgaard)
 Tale er guld, Gyldendal, 2006, 
 Fra krigsbarn til folkevalgt, DR Multimedie, 2007
 Gud, Grundtvig, Grundlov, Gyldendal, 2010,  (about N. F. S. Grundtvig)
 Det evigt menneskelige, Gyldendal, 2014,  (fairy tales by Hans Christian Andersen)
 Politierindringer, Gyldendal, 2018,  (about her 37 years in the police force)

Reference

External links
 

Danish jurists
Women police officers
University of Copenhagen alumni
1943 births
Living people
Politicians from Copenhagen
Women members of the Folketing
Danish Ministers for Ecclesiastical Affairs
Members of the Folketing 1984–1987
Members of the Folketing 1990–1994
Members of the Folketing 1994–1998
Members of the Folketing 1998–2001
Members of the Folketing 2001–2005
Members of the Folketing 2005–2007
Members of the Folketing 2007–2011
Members of the Folketing 2011–2015